René Alfredo Portillo Cuadra (born 12 December 1970) is a Salvadoran politician who is currently a deputy of the Legislative Assembly from the department of San Salvador.

Biography 

René Alfredo Portillo Cuadra was born on 12 December 1970 in Chinameca, San Miguel, El Salvador. He graduated from the University of El Salvador.

He was a vice presidential candidate and running mate of Norman Quijano of the Nationalist Republican Alliance (ARENA) for the 2014 presidential election, but lost the election to Salvador Sánchez Cerén and Óscar Ortiz

He was elected as a deputy of the Legislative Assembly from the department of San Salvador in the 2015 legislative election, and was reelected in 2018 and 2021. On 24 January 2023, he announced that he would not seek reelection as deputy in the 2024 election.

References 

1970 births
Living people
21st-century Salvadoran politicians
Nationalist Republican Alliance politicians
Members of the Legislative Assembly of El Salvador
People from San Miguel Department (El Salvador)